Uzbekistan Post is the company responsible for postal service in Uzbekistan and was established in 1991 after the collapse of the USSR. Since 2014, the company is an open joint stock company.

Universal Postal Union 
O′zbekiston Pochtasi has joined the Universal Postal Union as the "Post of Uzbekistan" on 24 February 1994.

Branches 
The Post operates the following 16 branch offices:
Karakalpak branch
Andijan branch
Bukhara branch
Dzhizakh branch
Kashkadarye branch
Navoiy branch
Namangan branch
Samarkand branch
Syrdarya branch
Surkhandarye branch
Fergana branch
Khoresm branch
Tashkent branch
"Tashkent pochtamti" branch
"Halqaro pochtamti" branch
"O'zbekiston markasi" PA

History 

The first stamps of Uzbekistan were issued on 7 May 1992. Before then, Uzbekistan used stamps of the Soviet Union. In 1993 and 1995, the Uzbekistan Post Office resorted to overprinting stamps of the Soviet Union as supplies of the new Uzbeki stamps ran low.

References

External links
 

Communications in Uzbekistan
Companies of Uzbekistan
Postal organizations